Fort Independence, originally named Camp Independence, was a fort located in the Owens Valley,  north of present-day Independence, Inyo County, eastern California. The U.S. Army post was active from 1862 to 1877.

History

Camp Independence
Camp Independence was established on Oak Creek in the valley on July 4, 1862, during the Owens Valley Indian War. It also served as an American Civil War army post. The fort was briefly abandoned at the end of hostilities with the Owens Valley Paiute in December 1864.

However, it was reoccupied by the Nevada Volunteers in March 1865, due to renewed conflict with the local Paiute. The post was finally abandoned on July 5, 1877. The military reservation was transferred to the Interior Department for disposition on July 22, 1884.

Fort Independence Reservation
When the military left the valley, the native Paiute and Shoshone peoples of the area held various allotments of land adjacent to the fort. The Fort Independence Reservation was officially established through executive orders Number 2264 and 2375 in 1915 and 1916.

Historical landmark
The site is a California Historical Landmark, with a historical marker on Highway 395.

See also
Fort Independence Indian Community of Paiute Indians 
California Historical Landmarks in Inyo County, California
History of Inyo County, California

References

External links

Independence
History of Inyo County, California
Owens Valley
California Historical Landmarks
Closed installations of the United States Army
California in the American Civil War
American Civil War army posts
Independence (California)
1862 establishments in California